IFK Halmstad, Idrottsföreningen Kamraterna, Halmstad, is a sports club in Halmstad, Sweden. The club was founded in 1895 and is now mainly active in athletics (track and field). In the first half of the 20th century, the club also had active departments in the sports of bandy (district champions in Halland in 1947) and association football.

Sources

Athletics clubs in Sweden
Defunct bandy clubs in Sweden
Defunct football clubs in Sweden
Halmstad
Association football clubs established in 1895
Bandy clubs established in 1895
1895 establishments in Sweden
Sport in Halmstad